Four ships of the Regia Marina, and the present day Italian Navy, have borne the name Duilio or Caio Duilio, the name commemorating the 3rd century BC Roman naval leader Gaius Duilius: 

  was an ironclad warship launched in 1876 and scrapped in 1909.
  was an  launched in 1913 and scrapped in 1957.
  was an  helicopter cruiser launched in 1962 and decommissioned in 1990.
  is an  destroyer launched in 2007 and currently in active service.

Italian Navy ship names